The manyscaled feylinia (Feylinia polylepis) is a species of skink in the family Scincidae. It is endemic to the island of Príncipe in São Tomé and Príncipe.

References

Feylinia
Skinks of Africa
Endemic fauna of Príncipe
Reptiles described in 1887
Taxa named by José Vicente Barbosa du Bocage